

Events
 
 U.S. Attorney Thomas Dewey successfully prosecutes mobster Jacob "Gurrah" Shapiro for violating the Sherman Anti-Trust Act. Shapiro receives a two-year sentence.
Syndicate numbers runner and bookie Lester "Binny" Binion is forced to flee Dallas, Texas.  Binion eventually opens Binion's Hotel and Casino in Las Vegas, Nevada.
January 4 – Ciro Terranova, a former boss of the New York Morello crime family, is arrested by New York City police on vagrancy charges as he was entering Manhattan.
February 14 – "Machine Gun" Jack McGurn, a high-ranking member of the Chicago Outfit and the reported organizer of Chicago's St. Valentine's Day Massacre, is murdered in a Milwaukee Avenue bowling alley, in Chicago.
May 1 – Alvin "Creepy Karpis" Karpowicz is arrested in New Orleans, he is the last of the public enemies to be captured and is the only public enemy to be captured alive.
May 19 – Nicholas Longo, the sister of Buffalo, New York mobster Steve Magaddino, is killed by a bomb explosion in an attempt on Maggadino's life.
June 6 – As part of his crusade against organized crime, U.S Attorney Thomas Dewey prosecutes New York mob leader Charles "Lucky" Luciano for pandering.  On this day, Luciano is convicted. He would later be sent to the Clinton Correctional Facility in Dannemora, New York.
July 15 – President Franklin Roosevelt orders the arrest of Ignazio "the Wolf" Lupo for violating the terms of his parole to serve the remaining sentence stemming from a counterfeiting charge in 1918.
August – While again attempting to return to Manhattan, Ciro Terranova is arrested on a second vagrancy charge and is held in custody.
August 17 – "Big Nose" John Avena, leader of the Philadelphia crime family, is gunned down by the rival Lanzetti Brothers.  This would begin a five-year gang war lasting until the death of William Lanzetti in 1939. After Avena's death, underboss Joe Bruno assumes control of the Philadelphia organization from his headquarters in New Jersey.
September 12–13 – Joseph Rosen, a Brownsville, Brooklyn candy store owner and government witness against Louis "Lepke" Buchalter, is murdered by Emmanuel Weiss, James Ferraco and Harry Strauss. The crime would remain unsolved until 1940, when mobster Abe Reles became a government informant and implicated Buchalter.

Arts and literature
Bullets or Ballots (film)  starring Edward G. Robinson and Humphrey Bogart.
Dead End (broadway play written by Sidney Kingsley)
Fury (film)  starring Sylvia Sidney and Spencer Tracy.
The Petrified Forest (film)  starring Humphrey Bogart.

Births
James Basile "Duke", Chicago Outfit bookmaker and later government informant
John DiGilio "Johnny Dee", Genovese crime family member involved in New Jersey waterfront labor racketeering and loansharking
Gaetano Mazzara "Tommy", business partner and cousin of Frank Castronovo involved in the Pizza Connection
Arnold Squitieri, underboss and acting boss of the Gambino Crime Family
Salvatore Mazzurco, brother-in-law of Giuseppe Lamberti and drug trafficker involved in the Pizza Connection
February 9 – Anthony DiLapi, Lucchese crime family soldier
June 22 – Masaru Takumi, the founding head of the Takumi-gumi

Deaths
Paul Kelly (Paolo Antonini Vaccarelli), Five Points Gang leader
February 14 – Jack McGurn (Vincenzo Gibaldi) "Machine Gun", Chicago Outfit member
August 17 – John Avena "Big Nose", Philadelphia crime syndicate leader
September 12–13 – Joseph Rosen, Brownsville candy store owner and government witness

Years in organized crime
Organized crime